Deep Tracks is the fourth compilation album released by American country music artist Faith Hill. It was released through Warner Bros. Nashville on November 18, 2016 and features a selection of album tracks from Hill's career that were never released as singles. Upon release, the album entered the Billboard Country Albums chart at No. 22.

Background
Deep Tracks was Hill's first full-length release in eight years and marked the final album in her contract with Warner, which served as label since her 1993 debut. Comprising mostly non-single tracks from her four most recent, non-Holiday studio albums – Faith (1998), Breathe (1999), Cry (2002), and Fireflies (2005) – the compilation also features three previously unreleased songs. One of these, "Why", was recorded in 2004 during the Fireflies album sessions, but ended up not making the final track list. The song was later released by country trio Rascal Flatts, also produced by Dann Huff. "Boy", one of the last songs she recorded for Warner, and "Come to Jesus", dedicated by Hill to her late mother, are also leftover songs from previous recording sessions.

Critical reception

Stephen Thomas Erlewine of AllMusic gave the album a mixed, three out of five star review. "This is straight-down-the-middle AAA country", he writes, "music that might not be hooky enough to be a hit, but that certainly speaks to a well-manicured lifestyle". Of the three previously unreleased tracks, CMT's Alison Bonaguro declared they "sound modern and fresh, regardless of when she recorded them".

Commercial performance
Deep Tracks debuted at number 22 on the Billboard Top Country Albums chart dated December 10, 2016 with 3,900 units sold in its first week. The album failed to enter the Billboard 200 but did reach number 94 on the Top Current Albums chart, which follows a similar methodology but excludes catalog albums.

Track listing

Charts

References

External links
 Deep Tracks at AllMusic

2016 compilation albums
Faith Hill albums
Warner Records albums
Albums produced by Byron Gallimore
Albums produced by Dann Huff